The American Association of Lutheran Churches (AALC, also known as The AALC) is an American Lutheran church body. It was formed on November 7, 1987, as a continuation of the American Lutheran Church denomination, the majority of which merged with the Lutheran Church in America and the Association of Evangelical Lutheran Churches to form the Evangelical Lutheran Church in America. The AALC offices were originally in Bloomington, Minnesota. The national office moved to Fort Wayne, Indiana, in 2007. As of 2008, it had 67 congregations, with about 16,000 members. In 2020, the denomination listed 59 congregations. Its current Presiding Pastor is the Rev. Dr. Cary G. Larson.

Historical background

The AALC began with 12 congregations and had, as of 2008, grown to 70 congregations spread across 23 states. The AALC sees itself as a confessional Lutheran church body in the United States. At its beginning, the AALC defined itself by what it saw as maintaining a commitment to the authority of Holy Scripture and the teaching of the Lutheran confessions by way of retaining the Confession of Faith of the American Lutheran Church. 

The AALC operates its own seminary, the American Lutheran Theological Seminary, originally located in Saint Paul, Minnesota. In fall 2005, the seminary relocated to Fort Wayne, Indiana, and is hosted by Concordia Theological Seminary of the Lutheran Church–Missouri Synod (LCMS).

The AALC holds to the inerrancy of scripture. It does not ordain women as pastors. However, women may serve as deaconesses. The AALC has two paths to ordination. In addition to serving in congregations, its rostered pastors also serve as chaplains in the U.S. Armed Services, hospitals, correctional facilities, law enforcement, hospice, and a host of other specialized ministries.

Two AALC pastors are well known within confessional Lutheranism: Chris Rosebrough of Pirate Christian Radio and Jordan Cooper, who is an author, conference speaker, and host of the Just and Sinner podcasts. The AALC is also the denominational home of Trinity Lutheran Church of San Pedro, California, which was a key church in the Lutheran Renewal movement in the 60's under the leadership of the Rev. Larry Christensen.

Fellowship with the Lutheran Church–Missouri Synod
Starting in 1989, representatives of the AALC and the Lutheran Church–Missouri Synod (LCMS) met in a series of official and unofficial talks. After six official meetings, at which various doctrinal papers were submitted, representatives of both the AALC and the LCMS recommended to their respective church bodies that they enter into altar and pulpit fellowship with one another. The proposal was brought before theology/doctrine commissions of each church body before being presented at their respective national conventions. During the June 20–23, 2007, AALC National Convention, the AALC declared fellowship with the LCMS; and voted to join the International Lutheran Council. On July 16, 2007, the LCMS declared fellowship with the AALC during the LCMS 63rd Regular Convention.

Basic beliefs

Affirms the full authority of the Bible as the inerrant and infallible Word of God
Holds that the Lutheran Confessions are a true interpretation of Scripture
Maintains a purpose focused on the Great Commission with priority for evangelism and world missions
Affirms the authority of the local congregation as the basic unit of the church

Presiding pastors
Rev. Dr. Duane L. Lindberg 1987–1999
Rev. Thomas V. Aadland 1999–2007
Rev. Franklin E. Hays 2007–2014
Rev. Dr. Curtis E. Leins 2014–2022
Rev. Dr. Cary G. Larson 2022–

References

External links

American Lutheran Theological Seminary website
Profile of the AALC on the Association of Religion Data Archives website

International Lutheran Council members
Lutheran denominations in North America
Christian organizations established in 1987